David S. Garber (1898–1984) was an American art director. He designed the sets for more than sixty film productions between 1926 and 1957, a large number of them westerns.

Selected filmography
 Fighting with Buffalo Bill (1926)
 The Denver Dude (1927)
 Desert Dust (1927)
 The Fighting Three (1927)
 Hard Fists (1927)
 Thunder Riders (1928)
 The Mounted Stranger (1930)
 70,000 Witnesses (1932)
 I Love That Man (1933)
 Private Scandal (1934)
 Gift of Gab (1934)
 Here Comes the Groom (1934)
 Nevada (1935)
 Rocky Mountain Mystery (1935)
 Desert Gold (1936)
 Drift Fence (1936)
 The Halliday Brand (1957)

References

Bibliography
 Roy Kinnard & Tony Crnkovich. The Films of Fay Wray. McFarland, 2015.

External links

1898 births
1984 deaths
American art directors
People from Indiana